Andrea Enria (born 3 July 1961) an Italian economist who currently serves as Chair of the European Central Bank's Supervisory Board, as of 1 January 2019. He previously served as the chairperson of the European Banking Authority (EBA) between 2011 and 2019.

Early life and education
Enria was born in the port of La Spezia and was raised by his father and grandparents after his mother’s early death. He studied economics at Bocconi University and holds a M. Phil. degree in Economics from the University of Cambridge.

Career
After his studies, Enria joined the Bank of Italy as an economist specialising in banking analysis, competition and regulation. In 1995, he briefly served as adviser to Italian Prime Minister Lamberto Dini.

From 1999 until 2004, Enria worked on banking supervision at the European Central Bank in Frankfurt. In 2004, he became the first secretary general of the newly established Committee of European Banking Supervisors (CEBS), based in London. From 2008 to 2010, he served as head of bank supervision at the Bank of Italy, under the leadership of governor Mario Draghi.

On 16 December 2015 Enria had his post at EBA renewed (until February 2021) after confirmation by the European Parliament previous public hearing held at the Committee on Economic and Monetary Affairs (ECON). 

By mid-2018, news media reported that the Italian government would nominate Enria to replace Danièle Nouy as Chair of the Supervisory Board at the European Central Bank; by September 2018, the ECB shortlisted him as one of only three candidates for the position. He was appointed Chair of the ECB Supervisory Board by the Council of the European Union on 6 December 2018 for a five-year term as of 1 January 2019.

References 

Italian economists
Italian bankers
Alumni of the University of Cambridge
1961 births
Living people
Bocconi University alumni